Marwan Madu (born January 20, 1991) is a Saudi football player, a goalkeeper, who plays for Al-Najma.

References

External links 
 

1991 births
Living people
Saudi Arabian footballers
Al Nassr FC players
Al-Orobah FC players
Al-Fayha FC players
Al-Shoulla FC players
Al-Bukayriyah FC players
Al-Rawdhah Club players
Al-Najma SC players
Saudi Fourth Division players
Saudi First Division League players
Saudi Professional League players
Association football goalkeepers
Saudi Second Division players